Alcmena may refer to:

 Alcmene, mother of Heracles in Greek mythology
 Alcmena, a genus of jumping spiders
 Dalytra, a genus of assassin bugs formerly referred to by the genus name Alcmena

See also
 Alcmene (disambiguation)